If I Could Do It All Over Again, I'd Do It All Over You is the second album by Canterbury scene band Caravan, released in September 1970. It was the predecessor to their best-known album In the Land of Grey and Pink (1971). The album is representative of the Canterbury scene genre, featuring representative organ solos and melodic vocals typical of the band's style. The album was released on Decca Records, as was the title track as a single release.

Background
Caravan had released their debut album, Caravan in 1968, achieving some live success and had appeared on UK and German television in early 1969. Unfortunately, their label, Verve Records shut down their British operations and dropped the band. Guitarist Pye Hastings later recalled "that situation really left us in limbo". The band regrouped and continued performing live, eventually finding a manager Terry King. David Hitchcock, an employee of Decca Records' art department, saw the band perform at the London Lyceum and recommend that his boss, Hugh Mendl sign them.

Sessions for the album started at Tangerine Studios on Balls Pond Road, Dalston, London in September 1969, with the band self-producing and Robin Sylvester engineering. Hastings recalled that this caused problems, as every member of the band wanted his instrument to be louder than the others. The band recorded a few tracks, but these were abandoned while the band went out on tour, having become popular on the university circuit in Britain and Europe. They regrouped in February the following year and recorded the songs on the album mostly live onto 8-track tape. The highlight of the sessions was a fourteen-minute jazz-rock piece assembled from various sections contributed by the band, called "For Richard". Keyboardist David Sinclair composed the basic structure, while bassist Richard Sinclair wrote the main tune. Hastings invited his brother Jimmy to guest on saxophone and flute, which would become a regular feature of Caravan's studio work.

The album title and title track is a quote often attributed to Spike Milligan but equally possibly deriving from a bootlegged Bob Dylan song "All Over You" ("Well, if I had to do it all over again/Babe, I’d do it all over you"), later released on The Bootleg Series, Vol 9: The Witmark Demos: 1962-1964.
 
The cover was shot in Holland Park, London and was photographed by David Jupe.

Release and reception

"Hello Hello", backed with the title track, was released as a single in August 1970, which led to an appearance on the BBC's Top of the Pops. The album was released the following month in the UK, and in March 1971 in the US. According to AllMusic, "If I Could Do It All Over Again contains significant progressions over the first album."

"For Richard" became a staple of live Caravan shows and was typically heard as the set closer. A fully orchestrated, live version can be heard on the 1974 release Caravan and the New Symphonia.

The CD was remastered in 2001, with the addition of bonus tracks, including the abandoned September 1969 sessions, and the out-take "A Day in the Life of Maurice Haylett", written about the band's road manager.

Track listing
All songs by Richard Coughlan, Pye Hastings, Richard Sinclair and Dave Sinclair.
Side one

Side two

Bonus tracks on 2001 CD rerelease

Personnel
Caravan
 Pye Hastings – vocals, 6- and 12-string electric guitars, 6 string acoustic guitar, claves, percussion (worn leather strap, ashtrays), voice (impersonation of a friendly gorilla)
 Richard Sinclair – vocals, bass guitar, tambourine, hedge clippers
 David Sinclair – Hammond organ, piano, harpsichord
 Richard Coughlan – drums, congas, bongos, maracas, finger cymbals

Additional personnel
 Jimmy Hastings – saxophone, flute
 Robin Sylvester – engineer
 David Jupe – photography and graphics
 Terry King – manager
 Maurice Haylett – road manager

References
Citations

Sources

External links
 Caravan - If I Could Do It All Over Again, I'd Do It All Over You (1970) album review by Lindsay Planer, credits & releases at AllMusic.com
 Caravan - If I Could Do It All Over Again, I'd Do It All Over You (1970) album releases & credits at Discogs.com
 

Caravan (band) albums
1970 albums
Decca Records albums